Juan Gabriel Celaya (born 14 February 1992) is an Argentine professional footballer who plays as a defender for Club Atlético Acassuso.

Career
Celaya began in the youth of his local side Unión de Arroyo Seco. His senior career began with Tigre in 2010, but he left two years later to sign for Primera B Metropolitana team Villa Dálmine. He went onto make ninety-three league appearances and scored four goals between 2012 and 2016 for the club, nine of those appearances and one of those goals came in the promotion-winning (to Primera B Nacional) season of 2014. In 2016, Celaya had two loan spells away from Villa Dálmine. Firstly, on 6 January, Celaya joined Argentine Primera División side Quilmes.

He participated in twelve league fixtures for Quilmes before terminating his loan due to disagreements with the club. In June 2016, Celaya joined another Primera División team, Arsenal de Sarandí, on loan. He made his debut for Arsenal on 27 August against Sarmiento. Celaya made just one further appearance before returning to his parent club. Celaya made his 100th career appearance for Villa Dálmine on 12 November 2017 versus Estudiantes. Celaya made a move to fellow Primera B Nacional squad Deportivo Morón in June 2018.

In December 2019, Celaya signed with Primera B Metropolitana side Club Atlético Acassuso.

Career statistics
.

References

External links

1992 births
Living people
Sportspeople from Santa Fe Province
Argentine footballers
Association football defenders
Primera B Metropolitana players
Primera Nacional players
Argentine Primera División players
Club Atlético Tigre footballers
Villa Dálmine footballers
Quilmes Atlético Club footballers
Arsenal de Sarandí footballers
Deportivo Morón footballers
Club Atlético Acassuso footballers